The eclipse of Thales was a solar eclipse that was, according to ancient Greek historian Herodotus, accurately predicted by the Greek philosopher Thales of Miletus. If Herodotus' account is accurate, this eclipse is the earliest recorded as being known in advance of its occurrence. Many historians believe that the predicted eclipse was the solar eclipse of 28 May 585 BC. How exactly Thales predicted the eclipse remains uncertain; some scholars assert the eclipse was never predicted at all. Others have argued for different dates, but only the eclipse of May 585 BC matches the conditions of visibility necessary to explain the historical event.

According to Herodotus, the appearance of the eclipse was interpreted as an omen, and interrupted a battle in a long-standing war between the Medes and the Lydians. American writer Isaac Asimov described this battle as the earliest historical event whose date is known with precision to the day, and called the prediction "the birth of science".

The eclipse 
The Halys River, the presumed site of the battle mentioned by Herodotus, is just within the error margin for ΔT provided.

Herodotus' account
Herodotus' The Histories 1.73–74 states that a war started in that period between the Medes and the Lydians.

Thales' prediction
While doubt has been cast on the truth of the story, there are other accounts of it besides that of Herodotus. Diogenes Laërtius says that Xenophanes, who lived in the same century as Thales, was impressed with the prediction, and he also gives additional testimonies from the pre-Socratics Democritus and Heraclitus.

Cicero mentions that Thales was the first man to successfully predict a solar eclipse during the reign of Astyages, the last king of the Median empire. Pliny the Elder mentions as well that Thales had predicted a solar eclipse during the reign of Alyattes of Lydia.

At the time of Thales' purported prediction it was not yet known that eclipses were caused by the Moon coming between the Earth and the Sun, a fact that would not be discovered until over a century later by either Anaxagoras or Empedocles.

If the account is true, it has been suggested that Thales would have had to calculate the timing of any eclipse by recognizing patterns in the periodicities of eclipses.

It has been postulated that Thales may have used the Saros cycle in his determination, or that he may have had some knowledge of Babylonian astronomy. However, Babylonians were far from being able to predict the local conditions of solar eclipses at that point, which makes this hypothesis highly unlikely. In fact, there is no known cycle that can be reliably used to predict an eclipse for a given location and, therefore, any accurate prediction would have been down to luck.

See also
 Mursili's eclipse
 Assyrian eclipse

References 

 K. Leloux, "The Battle of the Eclipse (May 28, 585 BC): A Discussion of the Lydo-Median treaty and the Halys border", in Polemos, 19-2 (2016), pp. 31–54
 
 
 Herodotus, The Histories, translated by Robin Waterfield, (1998). New York: Oxford University Press. 
 Tony Jacques: Dictionary of Battles And Sieges: A Guide to 8,500 Battles from Antiquity Through the Twenty-first Century. F-O Greenwood Publishing Group 2007, p. 428

External links 
 Wired.com: May 28, 585 B.C.: Predicted Solar Eclipse Stops Battle

585 BC
Thales
6th century BC
Ancient astronomy